Nanyumbu is one of the six districts of the southern Mtwara Region in Tanzania.

The 2016 population of Nanyamba was projected at 158,425, from 150,857 in the 2012 census.

References

Districts of Mtwara Region